União Sport Clube do Uíge is an Angolan football club based in Uíge. They made their debut in Girabola – the Angolan First Division – at the 2013–14 season, after being promoted from the Gira Angola.

The club plays their home matches at Uige's Estádio 4 de Janeiro

League & Cup Positions

Players and staff

Staff

Manager history

Players

See also
 Girabola
 Gira Angola

References

External links
Girabola Profile
Facebook Profile
2014 squad at girabola.com
http://www.rna.ao/radio5/noticias.cgi?ID=82814
http://desporto.sapo.pt/futebol/girabola/artigo/2013/12/18/uni_o_sport_clube_do_u_ge_prepar.html

Football clubs in Angola
Sports clubs in Angola